Haloa japonica, common name the Japanese bubble snail, is a species of sea snail or bubble snail, a marine opisthobranch gastropod mollusc in the family Haminoeidae, one of the families of bubble snails.

Distribution
The species is found in the Pacific Ocean, Mediterranean and North Sea:
 Japan
 Korea 
 Hong Kong 
 The Philippines 
 Thailand
 Mediterranean Sea including Sète and Étang de Berre, France
 California and Washington, USA
 Southern British Columbia, Canada
 Taiwan
 Netherlands (incl. Zeeland)

Description
Their shells have length around 11 mm and width around 8 mm.

Parasites
The parasites of Haloa japonica include an avian schistosome, which has been implicated in human cercarial dermatitis in San Francisco Bay, California.

References

Further reading
 Gosliner T. M. & Behrens D. W. (2006). "Anatomy of an invasion: systematics and distribution of the introduced opisthobranch snail, Haminoea japonica Pilsbry, 1895 (Gastropoda: Opisthobranchia: Haminoeidae)". Proceedings of the California Academy of Sciences 57: 1003–1010.
 Hanson D., Cooke S., Hirano Y., Malaquias M.A. E., Crocetta F. & Valdés Á. (2013) "Slipping through the Cracks: The Taxonomic Impediment Conceals the Origin and Dispersal of Haminoea japonica, an Invasive Species with Impacts to Human Health". PLoS ONE 8(10): e77457. 

japonica
Gastropods described in 1895